Im Hye-jin (born 3 June 1973) is a South Korean gymnast. She competed in six events at the 1988 Summer Olympics.

References

1973 births
Living people
South Korean female artistic gymnasts
Olympic gymnasts of South Korea
Gymnasts at the 1988 Summer Olympics
Place of birth missing (living people)
20th-century South Korean women